This is a list of the members of the 12th Riigikogu, following the 2011 election.

Election results

Lists

By party

Estonian Reform Party (33)

Estonian Centre Party (26)

Pro Patria and Res Publica Union (23)

Social Democratic Party (19)

By votes

References

12th